Douglas Soltis is a Distinguished Professor in the Laboratory of Molecular Systematics & Evolutionary Genetics, (Soltis lab.) Florida Museum of Natural History and Department of Biology at the University of Florida. His research interests are in plant evolution and phylogeny, an area in which he has published extensively together with his wife Pamela Soltis and together they were the joint awardees of the 2006 Asa Gray Award. They are the principal investigators in the Soltis laboratory, where they both hold the rank of Distinguished Professor and are contributing authors of the Angiosperm Phylogeny Group.

Soltis holds a Ph.D. from Indiana University (1980).

He is a member of the Editorial Board for PNAS.

Selected publications 
 . 2004. The origin and diversification of angiosperms. Am. J. Botany 91: 1614-1626
 . 2004. Pre-angiosperm duplication of floral genes and regulatory tinkering at the base of angiosperms. Am. J. Botany 91: 2102-2118
 . 2004. Molecular cytogenetic analysis of recently evolved Tragopogon (Asteraceae) allopolyploids reveal a karyotype that is additive of the diploid progenitors. Am. J. Botany 91: 1022-1035
 . 2004. Darwin's abominable mystery: Insights from a supertree of the angiosperms. Proceedings of the National Academy of Sciences, USA 101: 1904-1909.
 . 2003. Evolution of floral structures in basal angiosperms. International Journal of Plant Sciences 164: S329-S363.
 . 2003. An update of the Angiosperm Phylogeny Group classification for the orders and families of flowering plants: APG II. Bot. J. of the Linnean Soc. 141: 399-436
 . 2002. Rate heterogeneity among lineages of land plants: integration of molecular and fossil data and evidence for molecular living fossils. Proc. of the National Academy of Sci. USA 99: 4430-4435
 . 1999. Angiosperm phylogeny inferred from multiple genes: A research tool for comparative biology. Nature 402: 402-404
 . 2006. Developmental genetics of the flower. Volume 44 of Advances in botanical research incorporating advances in plant pathology. Academic Press, 616 pp.  en línea
 . 1992. Molecular systematics of plants. Editor Springer, 434 pp.  en línea
 . 1990. Isozymes in plant biology. Springer, 268 pp.  en línea

References

Bibliography 

 
 
 

American taxonomists
1953 births
Living people
University of Florida faculty
Botanical Society of America
21st-century American botanists